Parkview may refer to:

Geography
 Parkview, Indiana, an unincorporated community in Vigo County
 Parkview, St. Louis, Missouri, a neighborhood of St. Louis, Missouri, United States
 Parkview (Edmonton), a neighborhood in Canada
 Parkview, Gauteng, a suburb of Johannesburg, South Africa
 Parkview, New South Wales, a suburb in Australia
 O'Connor-Parkview, a neighbourhood near Toronto, Canada
 Hong Kong Parkview, a private housing estate in Tai Tam, Hong Kong

Schools and districts
 Parkview High School (Georgia), a public high school in Lilburn, Georgia
 Parkview High School (Springfield, Missouri), a public high school in Springfield, Missouri
 Parkview High School (Wisconsin), a public secondary school in village of Orfordville, Wisconsin
 Parkview Arts and Science Magnet High School, a magnet school in Little Rock, Arkansas
 Parkview Community College of Technology, a secondary school in Barrow-in-Furness, Cumbria, England
 Parkview School District, a school district serving areas of Rock County, Wisconsin, United States
 Parkview School (Edmonton), a school in the Parkview community of Edmonton, Alberta, Canada.
 Parkview Christian School, a Christian school in Yorkville, IL

Other meanings
 Parkview Health, a community health system in Indiana
 Parkview Medical Center, a hospital in Pueblo, Colorado
 Parkview Square, an office building in Singapore
 Parkview (SEPTA station), an interurban rapid transit station in Upper Darby Township, Pennsylvania

See also
 Park View (disambiguation)